Noemí de Miguel (born 14 February 1980) is a Spanish sports journalist and television presenter for Movistar+. De Miguel has also covered tennis on television, and has contributed to sports newspaper Diario AS.

Biography
De Miguel was born on 14 February 1980, in Autol, a town in the province of La Rioja. She was raised at her grandparents house in Autol because her mother and father worked continuously, and watched a wide variety of sports on television with her grandparents during her childhood. De Miguel was asked whether she wanted to pursue a career as a medicine doctor to which she replied she wanted to become a sports journalist. She did a degree in journalism in University of Bilbao, which she completed in 2002, and went on to complete a three-year internship at Radio Arnedo. De Miguel travelled to Madrid and passed the selection to become a sports reporter for Radio Nacional de España (RNE). This marked the beginning of her professional career and she started working for the broadcaster in 2002. Over the next three years, De Miguel contributed to the sports programme .

Her contract with RNE expired in late 2005 and she received a telephone call from television channel Canal+ who were seeking a female sports reporter. De Miguel accepted the job because she did not want to return to Autol to ask her parents for money and also worked for a Madrid-based newspaper. She began working for Canal+ in November 2005, covering association football. De Miguel was present at the 2006 FIFA World Cup in Germany, and covered various football tournaments such as the UEFA Champions League and La Liga, the 2010 FIFA World Cup in South Africa and UEFA Euro 2012. She also presented a daily tennis programme focused on the 2009 Wimbledon Championships, Canal+'s flagship late night sports programme El Día del Fútbol analysing La Liga matches alongside various football players from 2009 to 2015, and the programme El día después. 

In late 2015, De Miguel considered changing jobs because she felt she was not progressing personally and professionally and wanted to be challenged. Broadcaster Movistar+ began seeking for a new presenter for its coverage of Formula One motor racing following its take over of the rights from Antena 3. She was confirmed as taking on the role as presenter in February 2016, replacing Antena 3's . De Miguel received some suspicion and criticism in online forums prior to the start of the  season because of her background as an association football broadcaster. She found it not difficult to learn about Formula One jargon, and her first event was the 2016 Australian Grand Prix. In 2020, when Formula One was suspended by the Fédération Internationale de l'Automobile and the series' promoter Liberty Media due to the COVID-19 pandemic, she began a Movistar+ programme called Parque cerrado to remain in contact with individuals in the championship. 

In her career, De Miguel has contributed to sports newspaper Diario AS, and in January 2020, she was made an ambassador of the University Soccer project to help Spanish football players obtain scholarships to allow them to play in American university leagues and study at them.

Personal life
She is against gender abuse and prefers to keep her private life out of the press. De Miguel spoke about equality and representation of women in the Spanish media to radio broadcaster Cadena SER for International Women's Day 2015. She says she prepares for each race by reading motorsport books and magazines as well as working with former drivers and mechanics to learn about their roles in the sport. To combat the stress of working in Formula One, she took up running to allow her to catch up with the sport and to allow her to adapt to different time zones.

References

External links
 

1980 births
Living people
People from Calahorra
University of Deusto alumni
20th-century Spanish women
21st-century Spanish women writers
Spanish sports journalists
Women sports journalists
Spanish women journalists
Association football journalists
Tennis commentators
Formula One journalists and reporters